= Microhologram =

Holographic technology

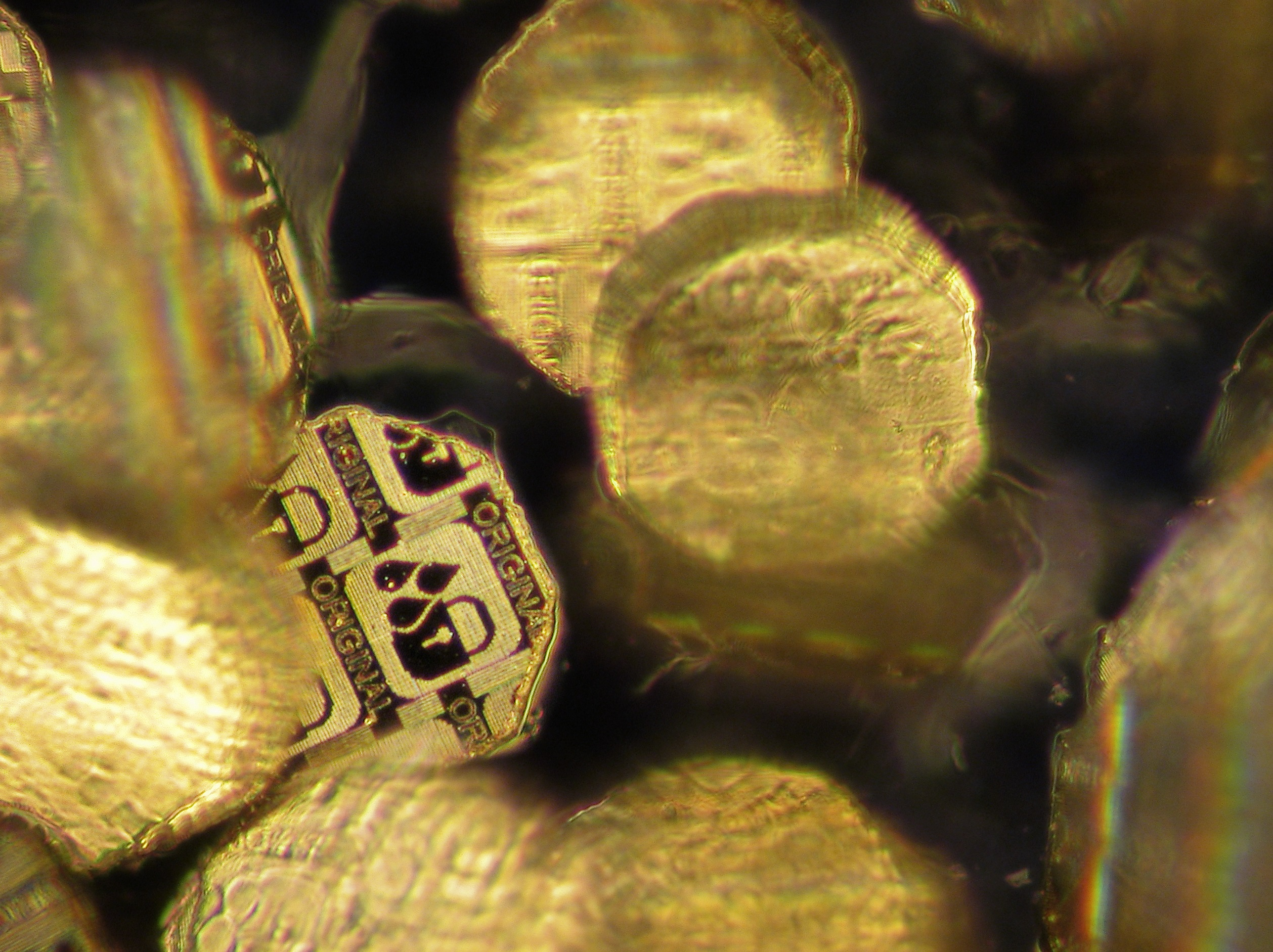

Microholograms are a technology for moving holographic protection to the level of primary material (substrate).

Documents, products, seals or other items can be equipped with a hologram. The hologram is expected to ensure anti-counterfeit protection because it can be neither copied nor imitated (provided that advanced technology has been used for hologram origination). Holograms are considered the strongest anti-counterfeit measure available. Connecting of a hologram with the protected item is a critical task, and there are many specific technologies for it. Microholograms enable to protect material (substrate)l for a production of documents, stamps, products, etc. Tiny metallic particles of the size from 40 micrometers to half a millimeter are blended into plastic, paper, foil, etc. There is a complete hologram on each particle.

Microholograms are always tailored for a particular organization, such as a bank, government, and premium goods producer. The organization decides about their:

- Shape (often hexagon or square),
- Hologram means visual effects,
- Letters engraved into each particle.

Application machines for production holographic substrates are available in the market. Using such substrate enriched with microholograms enables producers to implement anti-counterfeit protection at several levels.

Microholograms appear as metallic dust to a naked eye. However, an alarmed user can go deeper and inspect a document with a magnifier seeing their regular shape, engraved letters, and holographic surface. If suspicion persists, it is possible to go even deeper and watch microholograms with a microscope, checking complete hologram with all visual effects and perhaps specific forensic features.

Microholograms were invented by the anti-counterfeit research organization, OPTAGLIO, in 2004.

== Sources ==
- Article from holography news
- Description of microholograms on OPTAGLIO web site
- Technický týdeník (in Czech)
